Sound of Silence  is a 2017 Indian film in Hindi, Pahari and Tibetan. The film is directed by Malayalam film director Bijukumar Damodaran, commonly known as Dr. Biju. The film premiered at the 2017 Montreal World Film Festival. The film won an award for Best Director at the 2017 Kolkata International Film Festival in the Indian Film Competition category.

Plot
Set in a Himalayan valley, this film is about the journey of a mute boy who lost his mother at birth and is neglected by his father. When his father is sent to jail, the boy faces a lonely future. The boy's connection to a Buddhist monk helps him gain strength and transcend his suffering. With nowhere to go and facing unrequited love, he joins a Buddhist monastery.

Cast
 Master Govardhan as the boy
 Uday Chandra as the Monk
 Bhushan as the boy's father

Awards
 Best Director at 23rd Kolkata International Film Festival India 2017, · in Indian Competition Section
 Best Cinematography award at India International Film Festival Queensland, Brisbane, Australia 2017
 Best Music Director award at Aurangabad International Film Festival, India 2018, In Indian Film Competition section
 Best film at Indian Film Festival of Cincinnati in Ohio, USA in September 2018

Festival selections
The film was selected for presentation at 28 festivals, including the 41st Montreal World Film Festival, the 13th Eurasia International Film Festival, Kazakhstan. Main Competition and the Imagine India International Film Festival.

 41st Montreal World Film Festival, Canada. World Greats Section
 13th Eurasia International Film Festival, Kazakhstan. Main Competition
 Trinidad and Tobago Film Festival. Main Competition
 Asia Pacific Screen Awards, Australia.  In Competition
 20th Religion Today Film Festival, Italy. Main Competition
 28th Cinemagic Belfast Film festival, Northern Ireland. Main Competition  
 11th Great Lake International Film Festival, USA  In Competition
 16th Dhaka International Film Festival, Bangladesh. In Competition
 23rd Kolkata  International Film Festival, Indian Competition
 Third Eye Asian International Film Festival, India 2017
 All Lights India International Film Festival, India 2017
 12th JOGJA NETPAC Asian Film Festival, Indonesia, Asian Perspective Section
 6th Kolhapur International Film Festival, India 2017 
 5th Aurangabad International Film Festival, India 2017. Indian Competition Section
 India International Film Festival Queensland, Brisbane, Australia 2017
 Assam International Film Festival, India 2017
 Pune International Film Festival, India. January 2018
 Bangalore International Film Festival, India. February 2018
 Cambodia International Film Festival, March 2018
 Toulouse Indian Film Festival, Paris, France. April 2018
 This Buddhist Film Festival, Singapore. September 2018
 Habitat Film Festival, New Delhi. April 2018
 Imagine India International Film Festival, Madrid, Spain. July 2018
 BFFE- 'Buddhist Film Festival Europe', Amsterdam, September 2018. As Closing Film
 Asian Film Festival Barcelona, Spain. November 2018
 Indian Film Festival Melbourne, Australia, August 2018
 Indian Film Festival of Cincinnati, USA, Ohio., September 2018
 FFSI National Film Festival Kolkata, September 2018
 20th Bardhaman International Film Festival, India, December 2018
 11th International Guwahati Film Festival 2018, India, December 2018
 Buddhist International Film Festival Dikshabhumi, Nagpur, January 2019
 4th Alpin Film Festival, Romania, 2019  February 26 and March 3
 Buddhist film festival, Nepal  October 2019

References

External links

2017 films
2010s Hindi-language films
Tibetan-language films
Films set in the Himalayas
Films shot in Manali, Himachal Pradesh